The 2nd Army was an army level command of the German Army in World War I.  It was formed on mobilization in August 1914 from the III Army Inspection.  The army was disbanded in 1919 during demobilization after the war.

History 
The 2nd Army during World War I, fought on the Western Front and took part in the Schlieffen Plan offensive against France and Belgium in August 1914. Commanded by General Karl von Bülow, the 2nd Army's mission was to support the 1st Army's sweep around the left flank of the French Army and encircle Paris, bringing a rapid conclusion to the war. The 2nd Army laid siege to, and took the Belgian fortresses around Namur, and fought General Charles Lanrezac's French 5th Army at the Battle of Charleroi on 23–24 August 1914 and again at St. Quentin on 29–30 August 1914.

2nd Army bore the brunt of the Allied attack in the Battle of the Somme.  It had grown to such an extent that a decision was made to split it into two still-powerful armies.  Therefore, 1st Army was reformed on 19 July 1916 from the right (northern) wing of the 2nd Army.  The former commander of 2nd Army, General der Infanterie Fritz von Below, took command of 1st Army and 2nd Army got a new commander General der Artillerie Max von Gallwitz.  Von Gallwitz was also installed as commander of Heeresgruppe Gallwitz – Somme to co-ordinate the actions of both armies on the Somme.

A large proportion of the Army would be wiped out during the joint Anglo-French offensive on the Somme.

At the end of the war it was serving as part of Heeresgruppe Kronprinz Rupprecht.

Order of Battle, 30 October 1918 
By the end of the war, the 2nd Army was organised as:

Commanders 
The 2nd Army had the following commanders during its existence.

Glossary 
Armee-Abteilung or Army Detachment in the sense of "something detached from an Army".  It is not under the command of an Army so is in itself a small Army.
Armee-Gruppe or Army Group in the sense of a group within an Army and under its command, generally formed as a temporary measure for a specific task.
Heeresgruppe or Army Group in the sense of a number of armies under a single commander.

See also 

2nd Army (Wehrmacht) for the equivalent formation in World War II
German Army order of battle (1914)
German Army order of battle, Western Front (1918)
Schlieffen Plan

References

Bibliography 
 
 

02
Military units and formations established in 1914
Military units and formations disestablished in 1919